Carlos Pérez or Carlos Perez may refer to:

Sportspeople

Association football
Carlos Pérez Salvachúa (born 1973), Spanish football manager
Carlos Pérez (footballer, 1971–2006) (1971–2006), Spanish football midfielder
Carlos Pérez (footballer, born 1984), Spanish football winger 
Carlos Pérez (Paraguayan footballer) (born 1984), Paraguayan football forward
Carlos Roberto Pérez (born 1968), Mexican football manager and former player.

Baseball
Carlos Pérez (pitcher) (born 1971), Dominican baseball player
Carlos Pérez (catcher, born 1990), Venezuelan baseball player
Carlos Pérez (catcher, born 1996), Venezuelan baseball player

Other sports
Carlos Pérez (discus thrower), Mexican discus thrower
Carlos Pérez (runner) (born 1935), Spanish long-distance runner 
Carlos Pérez (long jumper), Spanish track and field athlete
Carlos Pérez (handballer) (born 1971), Cuban-Hungarian handball player
Carlos Pérez (kayaker) (born 1979), Spanish flatwater canoer and former world champion
Carlos Pérez (cyclist) (born 1970), Argentine cyclist
Carlos Pérez (weightlifter) (born 1938), Nicaraguan Olympic weightlifter
Carlos Pérez Suárez (born 1994), Mexican boxer

Other
Carlos Andrés Pérez (1922–2010), president of Venezuela
Carlos Pérez (radiation oncologist) (born 1934), American radiation oncologist
Carlos Pérez Soto (born 1954), Chilean physics lecturer
Carlos Pérez (guitarist) (born 1976), Chilean classical guitarist